The Ouidah Museum of History is an historical museum in Ouidah, Benin.

External links
Official site

Museums in Benin